The 2022 UC Santa Barbara Gauchos men's volleyball team represents University of California, Santa Barbara in the 2022 NCAA Division I & II men's volleyball season. The Gauchos, led by fourteenth year head coach Rick McLaughlin, split their home games between Robertson Gymnasium and The Thunderdome. The Gauchos compete as members of the Big West Conference and were picked as one of two teams to finish fourth in the Big West preseason poll.

Roster

Schedule
TV/Internet Streaming/Radio information:
ESPN+ will carry most home and all conference road games. All other road broadcasts will be carried by the schools respective streaming partner. 

 *-Indicates conference match.
 Times listed are Pacific Time Zone.

Rankings 

^The Media did not release a Pre-season or Post-Conference Tournament poll.

References

2022 in sports in California
2022 NCAA Division I & II men's volleyball season
2022 team
UC Santa Barbara